Cheat the Night is an extended play by country pop singer Deborah Allen.  Released in 1983 via RCA Records, the album includes the singles "Baby I Lied," "I've Been Wrong Before," and "I Hurt for You." Although this has never been on CD, four of its six tracks (the singles and "Cheat the Night") appeared on her later Anthology compilation. It has since been added to streaming services.

Critical reception

Michael McCall of AllMusic writes, "An EP features her two best-known hits of the 1980s, "Baby I Lied" and "I've Been Wrong Before." It's sweeter and softer-edged than her '90s work."

Track listing

Musicians

Deborah Allen – lead vocals
Fred Tackett – acoustic guitar (track 1)
Buzzy Feiten – electric guitar (track 1)
George Doering – electric guitar (track 1)
Neil Stubenhaus – bass (track 1)
Robbie Buchanan – keyboards and synthesizers (track 1)
Eddie Bayers – drums and percussion (tracks 2 to 6)
Tom Robb – bass (tracks 2 to 6)
Dennis Burnside – keyboards (tracks 2 to 6)
Bobby Ogdin – keyboards (tracks 2 to 6)
Steve Gibson – electric rhythm guitar (tracks 2 to 6)
Weldon Myrick – steel guitar (tracks 2 to 6)
Rafe Van Hoy – acoustic guitar and synthesizer (tracks 2 to 6)
Strings (tracks 2 to 6)
Arranged by Dennis Burnside
Performed by Carl Gorodetzky & The Nashville String Machine
Background vocals (track 1)
Herb Pederson
Joey Scarbury
Background vocals (tracks 2 to 6)
Don Gant
Dennis Wilson
Deborah Allen

Production

Produced by Rafe Van Hoy (tracks 2 to 6)
Produced and arranged by Charles Calello (track 1)
Mastered by Hank Williams
Recorded and mixed by Rick Rugger (track 1)
Recorded and mixed by Pat McMakin (tracks 2 to 6)
Additional recording by Russ Martin and Todd Cerney (tracks 2 to 6)
Assistant engineers – Russ Martin and Keith Odle (tracks 2 to 6)
Recorded and mixed at Ocean Way and The Mix Room (track 1)
Recorded and mixed at Emerald Sound Studio (tracks 2 to 6)
Additional recording at Creative Workshop & Sound Stage Studio (tracks 2 to 6)
Photography by Mark Tucker
Art direction by Bill Brunt

Track information and credits adapted from the EP's liner notes.

Charts

Weekly charts

Year-end charts

Singles

References

1983 EPs
Deborah Allen albums
albums arranged by Charles Calello
RCA Records EPs